Miguel Lonegro (13 January 1896 – 30 December 1945) was an Argentine sports shooter. He competed in the 50 m pistol event at the 1936 Summer Olympics.

References

External links
 

1896 births
1945 deaths
Argentine male sport shooters
Olympic shooters of Argentina
Shooters at the 1936 Summer Olympics
Place of birth missing